Laitila is a town and a municipality of Finland. The municipality has a population of 
which 
is water. The population density is
. The municipality is monolingually Finnish.

Laitila is renowned for its poultry farms and "egg festival" (Laitilan Munamarkkinat), which is why the subject of the municipal coat of arms of Laitila also refers to the parish's fame for chicken care. There is a lot of demand for Laitila-based chicken eggs, as the local egg producer company Munax, among other things, has even planned to egg exports all the way to South Korea. Laitila has also been called the "egg capital of Finland".

Culture
Laitila has a very large number of Iron Age antiquities, the most famous of which are the so-called the warrior's grave of Kodjala. Finland's oldest glass object, the Roman-era drinking horn, has been found in Laitila's Soukainen village. The nationally significant built cultural environments defined by the Finnish Heritage Agency in 2009 in Laitila include the Untamala and Suontaka villages and the Koukkela's the peasant house of Kauppila.

People
 Kaarlo Heininen (1853–1926)
 Pasi Saarela (born 1973)
 Mika Kares (born 1978)
 Valle Mäkelä (born 1986)
 Markus Seikola (born 1992)
 Susanna Tapani (born 1993)

References

External links

Town of Laitila – Official site 

Cities and towns in Finland
Municipalities of Southwest Finland
Populated places established in 1868